Super Chinese 3 is an action RPG video game released in 1991 for the Nintendo Entertainment System. It is the last of the NES Super Chinese games and was not released outside Japan.

Gameplay
Similar to Little Ninja Brothers before it, Super Chinese 3 incorporates role-playing video game elements into the gameplay.

External links
Super Chinese 3 at GameFAQs

1991 video games
Nintendo Entertainment System games
Nintendo Entertainment System-only games
Role-playing video games
Super Chinese
Japan-exclusive video games
Video games developed in Japan
Single-player video games